Probable phospholipid-transporting ATPase IC is an enzyme that in humans is encoded by the ATP8B1 gene. This protein is associated with progressive familial intrahepatic cholestasis type 1 as well as benign recurrent intrahepatic cholestasis.

Function 

This gene encodes a member of the P-type cation transport ATPase family and specifically belongs to the subfamily of aminophospholipid-transporting ATPases. This protein is highly expressed in the small intestine, stomach, pancreas, and prostate  and is also found in cholangiocytes and the canalicular membranes of hepatocytes in the liver. The aminophospholipid translocases transport phosphatidylserine and phosphatidylethanolamine from one side of a bilayer to another. Mutations in this gene may result in progressive familial intrahepatic cholestasis type 1 and in benign recurrent intrahepatic cholestasis. Exactly how mutations result in these diseases is not currently understood.

References

Further reading

External links
 
 

EC 7.6.2
Transmembrane proteins